Nytorv Square is a town square in Aalborg, Denmark.

Nytorv street was originally built as a funnel-shaped space between Østerågade and Slotsgade in 1604. The crossing at Nytorv and Østerågade is the historic center of the city and is open to pedestrians, cyclists and buses. 

Nytorv is characterized by a number of shops and professional services, from west to east, including Spar Nord, Jyske Bank, Sinnerup, Salling, ElGiganten, Imerco, Friis, a community center, and the main library.

References

Squares in Denmark
1604 establishments in Denmark